Phyllurus nepthys, also known commonly as the Eungella leaf-tailed gecko, is a species of lizard in the family Carphodactylidae. The species is endemic to Australia.

Etymology

The specific name, nepthys, refers to the ancient Egyptian goddess Nepthys.

Geographic range
P. nephthys is found in the Clarke Range in mideastern Queensland, Australia.

Description
The underside of P. nepthys is cream-colored, and is heavily peppered with brown. In all other species of Phyllurus the underside is mottled or unmarked.

Reproduction
P. nepthys is oviparous.

References

Further reading
Cogger HG (2014). Reptiles and Amphibians of Australia, Seventh Edition. Clayton, Victoria, Australia: CSIRO Publishing. xxx + 1,033 pp. .
Couper PJ, Covacevich JA, Moritz C (1993). "A review of the leaf-tailed geckos endemic to eastern Australia: a new genus, four new species, and other new data". Memoirs of the Queensland Museum 34 (1): 95–124. (Phyllurus nepthys, new species, pp. 115–117).
Wilson, Steve; Swan, Gerry (2013). A Complete Guide to Reptiles of Australia, Fourth Edition. Sydney: New Holland Publishers. 522 pp. .

Phyllurus
Geckos of Australia
Endemic fauna of Australia
Reptiles described in 1993
Taxa named by Patrick J. Couper
Taxa named by Jeanette Covacevich
Taxa named by Craig Moritz